Gukeng Township is a rural township in the easternmost part of Yunlin County, Taiwan. It is the largest township in the county.

Geography
 Area: 116.61 km2
 Population: 30,105 people (February 2023)

Administrative divisions
Jipan, Xinzhuang, Tunghe, Hebao, Gaolin, Shuidui, Tianxin, Gukeng, Zhaoyang, Xiping, Nanzi, Yongguang, Yongchang, Mayuan, Kanjiao, Huanan, Huashan, Guilin, Zhanghu and Caoling Village.

Economy
It is famous for agricultural produce, such as oranges, bamboo shoots, camellia oil and coffee bean.

Tourist attractions
 921 Feishan Viewing Platform
 Caoling
 Chi Guang Temple
 Honey Museum
 Huashan Leisure Area
 Janfusun Fancyworld
 Jiadong Walkway
 Penglai Waterfall
 Rocky Wall Ecology Park
 Taiwan Caoling National Geological Park
 Ten Thousand Year Gorge

References

External links

 Gukeng Township Office, Yunlin County

Townships in Yunlin County